Hatun Uqhu Punta (Quechua hatun big, uqhu swamp, punta peak; ridge, "big swamp peak", also spelled Jatunogo Punta) is a  mountain in the Andes of Peru which reaches a height of approximately . It is located in the Huánuco Region, Yarowilca Province, Chavinillo District.

References

Mountains of Peru
Mountains of Huánuco Region